The Master Arborist or Board Certified Master Arborist credential identifies professional arborists who have attained the highest level of aboriculture offered by the International Society of Arboriculture(ISA) and one of the two top levels in the field. There are several paths to the Board Certified Master Arborist, but typically on average each has been an ISA Certified Arborist a minimum of three to five years before qualifying for the exam (this can vary depending upon other education and experience). The certification began as a result of the need to distinguish the top few arborists and allow others to identify those with superior credentials.  The ISA added specialty certifications of Utility Specialist, for those maintaining vegetation around electric utility wires, Municipal Specialist, for those with additional experience managing public urban trees.

The Master Arborist examination is a far more extensive exam than the International Society of Arboriculture Certified Arborist Exam, and covers a broad scope of both aboriculture management, science and work practices.  

Another credential that is on a par with the Master Arborist is that of the American Society of Consulting Arborists, the  Registered Consulting Arborist.  There are perhaps six hundred individuals with that qualification, and only 70 arborists who hold both credentials.

The ISA Board Certified Master Arborist exam covers virtually every area of aboriculture (other than consulting), with the following areas covered on exam.

Science

Abiotic Influences
Soil Factors, Environmental Factors, Mechanical, Nursery Stock and Planting Practice, Phytotoxic Chemicals, Air Pollution (ozone, Peroxyacyl nitrates (PAN), sulfur dioxide)

Biology 
Organism, Population Ecology

Biotic Influences 
Entomology, Pathology, Wildlife considerations

Diagnostic Process 
Causes of Plant Disorders, Steps in Diagnosis

Diagnostic Tools 
Field and Laboratory Analysis

Plant Identification and Selection 
Classification, Plant attributes and characteristics

Soil Sciences 
Soil Formation, Soil Diagnostics and Testing, Characteristics of Urban Soils, Physical, Chemical, Biology, Water Capacity and Movement, Compaction, Organic Matter, Amendments

Practice

Climbing, Rigging, and Removal 
Equipment, Ropes and Knots, Climbing Techniques and Safety, Principles and Techniques of Rigging, Felling Techniques

Installation 
Site Selection, Species Selection, Installation Techniques, Rooted cutting, grafted, seedling, Post Planting Care 

IPM 
Definition and Philosophy of IPM, Monitoring, Inspection, and Documentation of Problems, Trees, Stress, and Pests, IPM/PHC Practices

Water Management 
Role of Water in Tree Health, Water Absorption and Movement in Tree, Effects of Water Stress, Turf and Tree Issues with Water Management, Soil Water Limits and Key Points, Water Movement, Irrigation, Reclaimed Water, Hydrogel, Water Quality, Plant Age/Condition/Species and Impact of Water or Irrigation 

Pruning 
Theory, Objectives, Types of Pruning, Practice, Pruning Specifications

Soil Treatments 
Chemical Treatments (Fertilization), Physical Treatments, Biological Treatments

Support & Protection 
Cabling, Bracing, Guying Established Trees, Lightning Protection, Inspection and Maintenance of Each System

Management

Business Relations 
Professional Ethics in Arboriculture, Industry Standards, Legal Requirements, Business Operations 
 
Inventory and Management Plans 
Urban/Rural Inventories, Components of a Landscape or Management Plan, Implementation and Maintenance of Plan

Plant Appraisal 
Methods, Other Considerations

Risk Assessment 
Components of Tree Risk Assessment, Factors Influencing Tree Risk, Evaluation of Defects, Evaluating the Effects of Decay on the Potential for Failure, Risk Rating Systems, Tree Risk Abatement, Duty and Standard of Care

Safety 
Electrical, Safe Work Practices, Standards, Laws and Regulations, Tools & Equipment Safety, Emergency Response Procedures, Personal Protection Equipment, Work Site Practices, Communications, Oversight, ID of Hazard Trees, Vehicles

Tree Preservation 
Tree Preservation Process, Designs to Minimize Impacts to Trees, Preconstruction Treatments, Tree Protection During Construction, Post Construction Care

References

External links
 http://www.isa-arbor.com/ International Society of Arboriculture
 http://www.treesaregood.org/ TreesAreGood.org (arboricultural resources for the general public)
 https://web.archive.org/web/20120529221746/http://www.isa-arbor.com/certification/verifyCredential/index.aspx Verify a Certified Arborist credential
 http://www.isa-arbor.com/certification/resources/cert_ExamOutline_BCMA.pdf BCMA (Board Certified Master Arborist) Exam Outline
 http://www.asca-consultants.org/ American Society of Consulting Arborists

Forestry occupations